The Teldreka Bridge is a bridge in Maolin District, Kaohsiung in Taiwan.

Name
Teldreka is derived from Rukai language name for Maolin.

History

In August 2009, Typhoon Morakot hit Taiwan and caused the road near the entrance of Maolin National Scenic Area to collapse. Due to that incident, the Kaohsiung County Government decided to build a bridge. The construction of the whole section of the bridge started on 14 December 2010 and was completed in April 2013 with a cost of NT$700 million. The bridge was opened on 20 April 2013 and was inaugurated on 11 May 2013.

Technical specifications
The bridge crosses the Zhuokou River.

See also
 List of bridges in Taiwan

References

2013 establishments in Taiwan
Bridges completed in 2013
Bridges in Kaohsiung
Maolin District